The Second Gerbrandy cabinet, also called the Third London cabinet was the Dutch government-in-exile from 27 July 1941 until 23 February 1945. The cabinet was formed by the political parties Roman Catholic State Party (RKSP), Social Democratic Workers' Party (SDAP), Anti-Revolutionary Party (ARP), Christian Historical Union (CHU), Free-thinking Democratic League (VDB) and the Liberal State Party (LSP) following the resignation of First Gerbrandy cabinet on 12 June 1941. The national unity government (War cabinet) was the third of four war cabinets of the government-in-exile in London during World War II.

Formation
On 12 June 1941 the First Gerbrandy cabinet fell after a conflict between Queen Wilhelmina and Minister of Defence Adriaan Dijxhoorn, leading to the dismissal of the minister. Immediately also the other ministers resigned and the cabinet continued for five weeks as a demissionary cabinet until the ministries were redistributed and the Second Gerbrandy cabinet was installed on 27 July 1941.

Term
The cabinet became the main inspiration for many of the resistance fighters in the Netherlands through radio addresses by Queen Wilhelmina. Important actions of the cabinet include the recognition of the Soviet Union in July 1942, the declaration of war against Japan on 7 December 1942, the announcement that after the war the relations between the Netherlands and the Dutch Indies will change and the re-establishment in July 1943 of the representation at the Vatican. During the first and second cabinet of Gerbrandy plans are made for post-war prosecution of "wrongful" (foute) Dutch civilians (collaborators with the Germans).

On 27 January 1945 Minister of the Interior Jaap Burger (SDAP) was asked to resign by Prime Minister Pieter Sjoerds Gerbrandy (ARP) after holding a radio speech, differentiating between "wrongful" Dutch civilians (foute Nederlanders) and Dutch civilians who made a mistake (Nederlanders die een fout hebben gemaakt). But because Pieter Sjoerds Gerbrandy did not discuss this with rest of the cabinet all Social Democratic Workers' Party ministers resigned in response. The demissionary cabinet continued until the installation of the Third Gerbrandy cabinet on 23 February 1945.

Changes
On 17 November 1941 Minister of Finance, Minister of Commerce, Industry and Shipping and Minister of Agriculture and Fisheries Max Steenberghe (RKSP) and Minister of Colonial Affairs Charles Welter (RKSP) both resigned after disagreements with the cabinet policy. Minister of Water Management Willem Albarda (SDAP) took over as Minister of Finance and Minister of Social Affairs Jan van den Tempel (SDAP) took over as Minister of Commerce, Industry and Shipping and Minister of Agriculture and Fisheries.

On 31 May 1944 Minister of Commerce, Industry and Shipping and Minister of Agriculture and Fisheries Piet Kerstens (RKSP) was dismissed over a disagreement about the post-war food distribution policy. Both the Ministry of Commerce, Industry and Shipping and the Ministry of Agriculture and Fisheries where subsequently reorganized. Minister of Finance Johannes van den Broek took over as Minister of Commerce, Industry and Agriculture adding the portfolio of Agriculture to the Commerce ministry. Government adviser Jim de Booy was appointed as Minister of Shipping and Fisheries combining the portfolios of Shipping and Fisheries.

Cabinet Members

 The age difference between the oldest and youngest cabinet member Gerrit Bolkestein (born 1871) and Jaap Burger (born 1904) was 32 years, 346 days.

References

External links
Official

  Kabinet-Gerbrandy I en II Parlement & Politiek

Cabinets of the Netherlands
1941 establishments in the Netherlands
1945 disestablishments in the Netherlands
Cabinets established in 1941
Cabinets disestablished in 1945
Netherlands in World War II
Governments in exile during World War II